3 Roses is an Indian Telugu-language streaming television series created by Maruthi, directed by Maggi and written by Ravi Namburi. Produced by SKN, the series features Eesha Rebba, Payal Rajput and Poorna in main roles. It premiered on Aha on 12 November 2021.

Synopsis 

It concerns three girls.Ritu, Jhanvi, and Indu are three of the best friends in the world, and their families call them back to Hyderabad so that the girls can get married and start new lives there. They happen to witness a series of events that alter their lives during this process.

Cast

Main 
 Eesha Rebba as Rithika "Ritu"
 Payal Rajput as Jhanavi
 Poorna as Indu

Recurring 
 Harsha Chemudu
 Hema, mother of Rithika
 Prince Cecil as Kabir
 Ishan as Sameer
 Sangeeth Sobhan as Alex
 Ravi Varma
 Satyam Rajesh
 Saurabh Dhingra as Pratyush
 Mahesh Achanta
 Naga Mahesh
 Apparao
 Sarayu Roy
 Sai Ronak
 Goparaju Ramana

Episodes

Soundtrack

Release 
The first four episodes of the series were premiered on 12 November 2021. Later, the following four episodes were premiered on 19 November 2021. Prior to the release of the series, it was mistaken to be a remake of Amazon Prime Video's Hindi series Four More Shots Please!.

Reception 
Thadhagath Pathi of The Times of India gave a critical rating of 2 out of 5 and stated: "On their way to make a new-age and youthful series, Maruthi and Maggie lose the track completely and more importantly, forget to update their material to suit the current generation. 3 Roses is just potential lost". Giving the similar rating, Pinkvilla echoed the same. In the review, the critic opined that "the characters are unidimensional, especially the elders, who are described as "enemies" by a pub singer. Ageist jokes are a staple here". The Hans India wrote that "The series is romantic as well as humorous. Maruti Mark has been instrumental in bringing the Kathmandu thing that is happening in our environment to life. Stir in the emotions along with the pleasure. The story, written by Ravi Namburi, was interestingly screened by director Maggie as the audience immersed themselves, is architecturally superior".

References

External links 

 

2021 web series debuts
Aha (streaming service) original programming
2021 Indian television series debuts
Indian comedy web series
Adult web series
Telugu-language web series
Indian drama web series